Hanna Lindholm (born 28 November 1979) is a Swedish long-distance runner. She competed in the women's half marathon at the 2020 World Athletics Half Marathon Championships held in Gdynia, Poland.

In 2014, she competed in the women's marathon at the European Athletics Championships held in Zürich, Switzerland where she finished in 42nd place. In 2018, she finished in 22nd place in the women's marathon at the European Athletics Championships held in Berlin, Germany. A month later, she won the women's race at the Stockholm Half Marathon held in Stockholm, Sweden.

She competed in the women's marathon at the 2022 World Athletics Championships held in Eugene, Oregon, United States.

References

External links 
 

Living people
1979 births
Place of birth missing (living people)
Swedish female long-distance runners
Swedish female marathon runners
Swedish Athletics Championships winners
20th-century Swedish women
21st-century Swedish women